Olesia Malashenko (born February 21, 1991) is a Ukrainian basketball player for Mersin Büyükşehir and the Ukrainian national team.

She participated at the EuroBasket Women 2017.

References

1991 births
Living people
Ukrainian expatriate sportspeople in Turkey
Ukrainian women's basketball players
Sportspeople from Chișinău
Power forwards (basketball)
Ukrainian expatriate basketball people in Turkey
Mersin Büyükşehir Belediyesi women's basketball players